Ramalina erosa is a species of fruticose lichen in the family Ramalinaceae. It was described as a new species by Hildur Krog in 1990.

The branching pattern is either dichotomous (divided into two parts) or irregular. The laciniae (long, slender, thallus lobes characteristic of genus Ramalina) are typically 0.4–3 mm wide and taper gradually to blunt tips. The base of the thallus has linear pseudocyphellae (minute pores that facilitate gas exchange). Soralia are oval-shaped and arranged in a lateral fashion on the thallus surface. They produce coarse granules, measuring about 200 μm, which often have short branches with hook-shaped tips. Secondary chemicals present in the lichen include divaricatic acid, triterpenoids, and a trace of usnic acid.

Ramalina erosa is found on the exposed rock faces of old volcanoes on Porto Santo Island, and is often growing with other more dominant Ramalina species. Because of the relatively small population estimate (less than 100 individuals) and its restricted distribution, in 2015 the lichen was assessed as endangered on the IUCN Red List of Threatened Species.

References

erosa
Lichen species
Fungi of Macaronesia
Lichens described in 1990
Taxa named by Hildur Krog